Fillmore Central School is a public school in Fillmore, Allegany County, New York, U.S.A. that serves grades pre-K to grade 12, and is the only school operated by the Fillmore Central School District. Its superintendent is Michael Dodge. Its principal of pre-K to grade 4 is Chelsey Aylor, and its principal of grades 5–12 is Eric Talbot.

Footnotes

Public high schools in Allegany County, New York
Public middle schools in New York (state)
Public elementary schools in New York (state)
School districts in New York (state)